Spitfire is a 1934 American Pre-Code drama film based on the play Trigger by Lula Vollmer. It was directed by John Cromwell and starred Katharine Hepburn, Robert Young and Ralph Bellamy.

Premise
Two engineers building a dam in the mountains, John Stafford (Robert Young) and George Fleetwood (Ralph Bellamy), are attracted to local hillbilly "spitfire" Trigger Hicks (Katharine Hepburn) who is the local faith healer. Things come to a head when the locals think that she is a witch.

Cast
Katharine Hepburn as Trigger Hicks
Robert Young as John Stafford
Ralph Bellamy as George Fleetwood
Martha Sleeper as Eleanor Stafford
Louis Mason as Bill Grayson
Sara Haden (as Sarah Haden) as Etta Dawson
Virginia Howell as Granny Raines
Sidney Toler as Jim Sawyer
Will Geer (as High Ghere) as West Fry
John Beck as Jake Hawkins
Therese Wittler as Mrs. Jim Sawyer

Reception
The film was popular and (after cinema circuits deducted their exhibition percentage of box office ticket sales) made a profit of $113,000.

References

External links
 
 

1934 films
1934 drama films
American drama films
American black-and-white films
Films directed by John Cromwell
Films with screenplays by Jane Murfin
RKO Pictures films
1930s English-language films
1930s American films
Films scored by Bernhard Kaun
Films about witchcraft
Films about faith healing
Films about hillbillies